The 2002 United States House elections in Pennsylvania was an election for Pennsylvania's delegation to the United States House of Representatives, which occurred as part of the general election of the House of Representatives on November 5, 2002.

The election between George Gekas and Tim Holden was described as "PA's most exciting match-up" by the political website PoliticsPA.

General election

See also
 United States congressional delegations from Pennsylvania
 108th United States Congress

References

2002
Pennsylvania
United States House of Representatives